Ari Juhani Sulander (born 6 January 1969), nicknamed Sulo, is a retired Swiss-Finnish professional ice hockey goaltender.

Career in Finland
Sulander played nine seasons for Jokerit Helsinki in Finland's SM-liiga, winning four league championships (1992, 1994, 1996, 1997). He also won one Silver (1995), one Bronze (1998), two European Championships (1995 and 1996) and one European Championship Bronze (93).

Sulander began with Jokerit as a Junior and progressed through the team all the way to position of No. 1 goaltender. During his Jokerit career, he played with SM-liiga stars such as Otakar Janecký, Teemu Selänne, Waltteri Immonen, and Jari Kurri, who played for Jokerit during the 1994–95 NHL lockout. In his time there, Sulander was coached by top coaches like Hannu Aravirta, Boris Mayorov, and Jukka Ropponen.

In November 2010, Sulander joined the Lahti Pelicans on loan for six games.

Career in Switzerland
Sulander left Jokerit after winning Bronze in 1998 for a new challenge. Sulander played the final 14 years of his career with the ZSC Lions (Zürich) of the Swiss top League, the Nationalliga A. Sulander scored a goal during a Nationalliga A game in the 2002–03 season.

Sulander won the NLA championship with ZSC four times (2000, 2001, 2008, 2012) and the Champions Hockey League in 2008–09.

In 2011, Sulander received his Swiss citizenship.

International career

 

Ari Sulander played for a total of 117 games for the Finnish national team (dressed in 117, played 68). He played in the 1993, 1995, 1996, 1997, 1998, 1999, and 2000 Ice Hockey World Championships and the 1998 Winter Olympic Games.

In the World Championships Sulander won one Gold, two Silver, and one Bronze medals. Sulander also won the Bronze in the 1998 Winter Olympics and was a key player in the Bronze game against NHL star powered Canada, led by Wayne Gretzky and Patrick Roy. Besides the 1998 Olympic tournament, Sulander also played well in the 1998 Ice Hockey World Championships.

External links

1969 births
Living people
Finnish ice hockey goaltenders
Finnish ice hockey world championship gold medalists
Ice hockey players at the 1998 Winter Olympics
Jokerit players
Kiekko-Vantaa players
Medalists at the 1998 Winter Olympics
Olympic bronze medalists for Finland
Olympic ice hockey players of Finland
Olympic medalists in ice hockey
Lahti Pelicans players
Ice hockey people from Helsinki
Swiss ice hockey goaltenders
ZSC Lions players
Finnish expatriate ice hockey players in Switzerland
Naturalised citizens of Switzerland
Swiss people of Finnish descent